The Quitter is a 1934 American drama film directed by Richard Thorpe and starring Charley Grapewin, Emma Dunn and Barbara Weeks. It was produced and distributed by the Poverty Row studio Chesterfield Pictures, later absorbed into Republic.

Synopsis
When her husband, the founder of a crusading newspaper, doesn't return from serving in France in World War I his wife takes over both the newspaper and the raising of their two sons. As he grows one of her sons wants the newspaper to abandon its traditional stance and try and move more up market. Stories also begin to circulate that her husband did not die in the war, but is still living abroad under a new identity.

Cast
 Charley Grapewin as 	Ed Tilford
 Emma Dunn as 	Cordelia Tilford
 William Bakewell as 	Russell Tilford
 Barbara Weeks as 	Diana Winthrop
 Hale Hamilton as 	Maj. Stephen Winthrop
 Glen Boles as Eddie Tilford
 Mary Kornman as 	Annabelle Hibbs
 Lafe McKee as Zack
 Aggie Herring as Hannah
 Jane Keckley as 	Sister Hooten
 Edward LeSaint as 	Travers	
 John Elliott as Advertiser 
 Frank LaRue as Townsman 
 Phillips Smalley as Graham the Banker

References

Bibliography
 Pitts, Michael R. Poverty Row Studios, 1929-1940. McFarland & Company, 2005.

External links
 

1934 films
1934 drama films
1930s English-language films
American drama films
Films directed by Richard Thorpe
American black-and-white films
Chesterfield Pictures films
1930s American films